Sultan Al-Farhan (born 25 September 1996) is a Saudi Arabian professional footballer who plays as a midfielder for Al-Raed, whom he captains.

Career
Al-Farhan started his career at Al-Hilal and is a product of Al-Hilal's youth system. He signed his first professional contract with the club on 31 January 2017. On 5 August 2017, Al-Farhan was released from his contract by Al-Hilal and then joined Al-Raed. On 27 May 2018, Al-Farhan renewed his contract with Al-Raed. On 23 December 2019, Al-Farhan renewed his contract with Al-Raed until the end of the 2022–23 season. On 29 October 2021, Al-Farhan made his 100th appearance for Al-Raed.

Career statistics

Club

References

External links
 

1996 births
Living people
People from Eastern Province, Saudi Arabia
Association football midfielders
Saudi Arabian footballers
Saudi Arabia youth international footballers
Saudi Professional League players
Al Hilal SFC players
Al-Raed FC players